The following is a list of fictional government agencies, comic book organizations that have been published by DC Comics and their imprints.

A

Agency
The Agency was formed by Amanda Waller to serve as a small, quasi-independent branch of Task Force X. It performed global operations which were vital to the security of American interests. Valentina Vostok brought former NYPD Lieutenant Harry Stein into the Agency as an operative. Adrian Chase (the Vigilante) and Christopher Smith (Peacemaker) were contract operatives for the Agency.

Agency in other media
The Agency appears in Batman: The Enemy Within. As in the comics, it is led by Amanda Waller herself and its known members include Iman Avesta (voiced by Emily O'Brien), Vernon Blake (voiced by Christian Lanz), Mario Fernandez (voiced by Robert Clotworthy), Roger Harrison (voiced by John Eric Bentley), and an assortment of other unnamed agents (variously voiced by Mark Barbolak, John Eric Bentley, J.B. Blanc, Matthew Mercer, Emily O'Brien, Laura Post, Kirk Thornton, Kari Wahlgren, Debra Wilson, and Wally Wingert). The Agency seeks to stop the Riddler and the villainous group he was formerly associated with known as the Pact (consisting of Harley Quinn, Bane, Mr. Freeze, "John Doe" and Catwoman), trying to hunt down the former to stop his criminal activities and the latter in order to stop them from stealing vials related to a plan called "Project Lotus" that can threaten Gotham and the world with a virus. The vials came from the group SANCTUS who later had their partnership dissolved from the Agency. They later encase the Riddler's deceased body in a container after learning he survived the virus. Their interference causes a clash with Commissioner James Gordon and the GCPD; depending on the player's choice, Batman can either come to trust and ally with Waller and the Agency, straining his relationship with Gordon or continue being at odds with them, stand with Gordon and prefer his help. Regardless, Waller blackmails Batman to act as a double agent within the Pact and learn their motives and stop them from stealing the vials containing the virus by threatening to reveal his secret identity if he does not cooperate. The showdown between the Agency and the Pact occurs at the hideout of SANCTUS which ended with Harley Quinn getting away with the virus and Mr. Freeze getting infected. In the end if the player chooses the path where Doe becomes the vigilante Joker, Waller will feel betrayed and the Agency begins attacking both Batman and the Joker with Waller even having Bane, Quinn, and Catwoman under her control and forcing them to fight Batman and the Joker, during which the Agency suffers losses and many members are killed. Regardless, Waller will later pull the Agency operatives out of Gotham City.

A.P.E.S.
A.P.E.S. (short for All-Purpose Enforcement Squad) is a semi-independent U.S. governmental division within the D.E.O., possessing government IDs for multiple agencies ranging from the FBI to Scotland Yard and SMERSH; an agent has described the organisation as possessing more clearance than God. Donald Fite, father of the Empress, and Ishito Maad are their most well-known operatives. Their main headquarters is inside Mount Rushmore.

Argent
Argent was the domestic branch of Task Force X. It was a sister organization to the Suicide Squad. Argent was led by Control and consisted mainly of former OSS (Office of Strategic Services) agents. Argent was a powerful agency during most of the Cold War. After confronting and killing a government official responsible for the assassination of President Kennedy, Control ordered all records of Argent destroyed and pulled the organisation undercover. For years, the Argent continued their work in secret, but shrunk considerably in size. Eventually, Control died, but his granddaughter, Anne-Marie Vere, maintained the pretense that he was still alive to keep the group operating. In recent times, a confrontation with the Suicide Squad exposed the deception and Argent disbanded. Known agents of the Argent included Control, Falcon, Fleur, Iron Munro, Phantom Lady and Anne-Marie Vere.

A.R.G.U.S.

Advanced Research Group Uniting Super-Humans (A.R.G.U.S.) is a U.S. federal agency operating under the jurisdiction of Homeland Security. It is under the command of Col. Steve Trevor and Director Amanda Waller.

A.S.A.
The A.S.A. (short for American Security Agency) was a U.S. government organization that supervised the creation of the national team of super-agents called the Force of July. The chairman of the A.S.A. was B. Eric Blairman. Blairman was later replaced as head of the A.S.A. by the even more corrupt Abraham Lincoln Carlyle, who made an attempt to use the Psycho Pirate's Medusa Mask to get himself elected president. During an internecine war within the U.S. Government called the Janus Directive, Carlyle and most of the Force of July were killed in battle. The American Security Agency was made defunct shortly afterwards.

A variation of the A.S.A. appears in Black Lightning. In this show, it is stated that Peter Gambi under his real name of Peter Esposito used to work for the A.S.A. as their spotter. When he left, they gained Vice-Principal Kara Fowdy (portrayed by Skye P. Marshall) as their new spotter. During season one, a faction of the A.S.A. led by Martin Proctor (portrayed by Gregg Henry) has been abducting emerging metahumans and having them stored in pods so that he can build an army. He even planned to expand it by arranging for Black Lightning to be abducted so that they can harvest his DNA. By the season finale, A.S.A. agents assault the Pierce family and Peter Gambi at a house in North Freeland which led to where Black Lightning, Thunder, and Peter fought some of them which ended with most of the agents dead or retreating when Deputy Chief Henderson and the police were approaching. During a confrontation at one of the warehouses storing the metahuman stasis pods, Martin is briefly attacked by Jennifer and shot by Gambi. The news media broadcasts the information that exposed Proctor's rogue operation. As for the briefcase, it falls into the hands of Tobias Whale following his, Syonide, and Painkiller's raid on an A.S.A. base where he had Proctor's thumbs salvaged by his coroner ally. In season two, Lynn Stewart works with the A.S.A. agents that work for Agent Percy Odell (portrayed by Bill Duke) in preserving the pods to the point where they even enlisted convicted scientist Helga Jace to assist in it. As one of the contents in the briefcase, Tobias Whale's latest ally Todd Green cracked the code contained in it which revealed that the A.S.A. was developing metahumans for Project Masters of Disaster. At the same time, Agent Odell secretly has the Pierce family under surveillance when he gets suspicious of them. By the end of season two, Agent Odell visits the Pierce family with his knowledge on Jefferson, Anissa, and Jennifer being Black Lightning, Thunder, and Lightning. He mentions that the metahuman pods have attracted the attention of the Markovians who have reclaimed Helga Jace and would like Black Lightning, Thunder, and Lightning to help the A.S.A. when the Markovians turn Freeland into a battleground. In the third season, Agent Odell starts having the A.S.A. soldiers round up any young metahumans and have Deputy Chief Henderson impose a curfew to keep the young metahumans from falling into the hands of the Markovians. Odell is assisted by Commander Carson Williams (portrayed by Christopher B. Duncan), Major Sara Grey (portrayed by Katy M. O'Brian), and Sergeant Gardner Grayle (portrayed by Boone Platt). It was also revealed by Tobias Whale to Issa Williams that Martin Proctor worked for Odell and Odell works for the President of the United States. The A.S.A.'s motives have often clashed with a resistance that is secretly led by Chief Henderson. By the season three finale and after the Markovian invasion on Freeland, Carson Williams is killed by Lynn Stewart in self-defense, Sara Grey is killed by Technocrat during his and Gambi's shootout with her commandos, Gardner Grayle sides with the rebels, and Odell is wounded by Khalil and arrested. During the congressional hearing where Black Lightning exposed the A.S.A.'s experiments as well as Markovia's experiments using the decrypted briefcase they have, Representative Nagar states that Odell will be prosecuted and the A.S.A. will be disbanded.

B

B.A.A.
The B.A.A. (short for Bureau of Amplified Animals) is a U.S. government agency that monitors and deploys enhanced animal super-operatives. Currently known operatives of the Bureau are Rex the Wonder Dog and Detective Chimp.

Bureau of Normalcy
The Bureau of Normalcy, formerly the Bureau of Oddities, is an organization dedicated to the weaponization or eradication of entities they deem to be odd. Introduced in Doom Patrol and based on Men from N.O.W.H.E.R.E. from the Doom Patrol comics.

C

C.B.I.
The C.B.I. (Central Bureau of Intelligence) was formerly led by Sarge Steel and also included Danny Chase (and his parents), King Faraday, Richard Dragon, and Ben Turner in its stable of agents. Steel was eventually depicted as a Federal Cabinet Secretary of Metahuman Affairs (giving him control of agencies such as the Suicide Squad), until the election of Lex Luthor as president. Luthor then appointed Amanda Waller as his replacement until he was exposed as a criminal in the events of Superman/Batman: Public Enemies.

Civil Defense Administration
The Civil Defense Administration is a U.S. intelligence agency created as a replacement for International Operations. It is led by Ivana Baiul as seen in the pages of Stormwatch: Team Achilles.

C.E.M.A.
C.E.M.A. (short for Cosmic Emergency Management Agency) is an interstellar organization tasked to help the survivors of cosmic disasters such as planet-eating monsters.

Checkmate

Checkmate is a covert operations agency within the DC Comics Universe. Created from the ashes of its predecessor group, the Agency, it was originally set up by Amanda Waller to serve as a small, quasi-independent branch of Task Force X under the command of Colonel Valentina Vostok (formerly Negative Woman of the Doom Patrol) to perform operations worldwide considered vital to the security of American interests. In the wake of events depicted in the miniseries The OMAC Project and Infinite Crisis, Checkmate has been re-chartered as a United Nations Security Council-affiliated agency.

Checkmate's original hierarchy was modelled after the pieces of a chess game - one King, one Queen, and several Bishops. The Bishops oversaw the Rooks behind the scenes, while the Rooks planned missions and supervised the field agents, or Knights, and the Knights' support, Pawns.

Pursuant to UN Security Council Resolution 1696, Checkmate was reorganized as the UN's chartered metahuman monitoring force. The organization was restructured, utilizing the "Rule of Two". Each super-powered or otherwise enhanced member in the "Royal Family" must have an un-powered counterpart in a corresponding position of power. In addition, there are an indeterminate number of "Pawns". In the original incarnation of Checkmate, they were low-level field agents that provided intelligence-gathering, logistical and operational support; it appears that the Pawns in the current incarnation serve similar roles.

Checkmate! (Russia)

The Russian version of Checkmate was introduced in the last issues of the original series run. They were admittedly underfunded but wore armor similar to their U.S. counterparts.

D

D.E.O.

The D.E.O. (short for Department of Extranormal Operations) is a branch of the U.S. government concerned with the magical, the alien, and the superhuman and having connections with such organizations as the Suicide Squad and Knightwatch. Other divisions include an agency for training 'gifted' youngsters whose powers manifest at a difficult age, and numerous surveillance and data-collection operations. The current Regional Director for the Eastern Seaboard is a former costumed villain named Mister Bones. One of its highest-profile agents is Cameron Chase.

Département Gamma
Département Gamma is the main French covert ops organization in the DC Comics universe. Known operatives are Andre Chevard (Boy Commandos) founder and leader, Fleur-de-Lis (Global Guardians), Belphegor (Global Guardians), Tin, the Captain, the Professor, and Halfwolf.

Department PSI
Department PSI (short for Department for Paranormal Science Investigations) is a rival organization to the International Operations and employer of the superhero team Wildcore. Its director is Antonio Giovanni. When International Operations was dissolved, Department PSI absorbed most of its assets, equipment, and personnel.

D.M.A.
The D.M.A. (short for Department of Metahuman Affairs) is a division within the D.E.O. Known operatives are Sarge Steel, Tom Tresser (Nemesis), and Diana Prince (Wonder Woman).

D.S.I.
The D.S.I. (short for Department of Scientific Investigation) is a government organization dedicated to the investigation of strange phenomena. Known operatives were Darwin Jones, the chief of staff, and Tommy Dane, one of the Young Scienceers.

E

E.A.G.L.E.
E.A.G.L.E. (short for Extranormal Activities Garrison for Law Enforcement) is a government agency within the Astro City universe. They are described to normally function as a sort of "clean up crew" for the superheroes ("taking supervillains into custody, guarding damaged property, etc."), but during the Confession storyline they are seen hunting down, and capturing, various superheroes. After the storyline, it is implied that they returned to their normal duties.

F

FDAA
Introduced in issue #1 of The American Way, the FDAA (short for Federal Disaster Assistance Administration) handles a U.S. government superhero team called the Civil Defense Corps. The FDAA is responsible for using gene therapy to create many of America's heroes as well as "villains" who they have fight the heroes in publicly staged battles. The FDAA periodically unleashes Hellbent, a homicidal and sociopathic supervillain, to assassinate enemies of the United States.

Finger, Eye, and Ear
The Finger (secret police), the Eye (CCTV monitoring), and the Ear (phone surveillance) were the three branches of overt government surveillance depicted in the dystopian Britain of V for Vendetta.

G

G.E.O.R.G.E.
G.E.O.R.G.E. (short for the Group for Extermination of Organizations of Revenge, Greed, and Evil) debuted in Blackhawk #228, during that title's attempt to mainstream the Blackhawks as superheroes. G.E.O.R.G.E. opposed the International Crime Combine, a supraorganization made up of operatives from various other criminal organizations some based in the DC Comics Universe, like CYCLOPS and O.G.R.E., and other fictional organizations such as THRUSH and SPECTRE. Known G.E.O.R.G.E. operatives were their leader the Long L, Mister Delta, and the Champ, a trenchcoat-wearing robot.

Global Peace Agency

The Global Peace Agency is an organization that first appeared outside the DC Universe in the original OMAC series, but which became part of the DCU proper in Final Crisis #7.

G.O.O.D.
G.O.O.D. (short for Global Organization of Organized Defense) is an international organization where the only known operatives are Barney Ling (the organization's director) and field operatives Ben Turner and Richard Dragon.

H

Hayoth

The Hayoth are a team of four super-powered covert operatives who act as a special division of the Mossad. Their first contact with the West came when Amanda Waller (see Suicide Squad) was contracted to capture Kobra. Waller was informed of the Hayoth's existence by an Egyptian operative named Nazair.

Human Defense Corps

In the DC Comics Universe, the Human Defense Corps is a branch of the military established by then President of the United States Lex Luthor to reduce government dependency on superhumans when a major alien crisis breaks out, act as back-up to Earth's superheroes, and specifically counter any alien threat to Earth. Membership of the Corps is open to 'Decorated veterans of alien campaigns only'.

I

International Operations
Internal Operations (I.O., IO or I/O) is a fictional U.S. intelligence agency in WildStorm comics. It was originally called International Operations. I.O. (International Operations) was founded in 1964 as a branch of the CIA with the mission to safeguard the United States' interests and safety abroad. It quickly became an independent agency under the leadership of Director Miles Craven. Following the Divine Right incident, the agency was severely weakened. It was shut down by the U.S. government within a year, but in 2004, it was reestablished under the leadership of John Lynch. IO first appeared in WildC.A.T.S. #1 (August 1992) and was created by Brandon Choi and Jim Lee.

K

Knightwatch
Knightwatch is the military arm of the D.E.O. Knightwatch operatives wore armor that resembled the suits worn by Checkmate agents.

Knightwatch in other media
Knightwatch appears in the seventh season of the superhero television series Arrow. In flash-forwards set in 2040, Connor Hawke is an agent of Knightwatch, who are described as a "good version of A.R.G.U.S." This version appears to be more grounded than its comic book counterpart, having no connection to the "extranormal" and instead focusing on everyday threats.

L

LexCorp
LexCorp is a government position run by President Lex Luthor.

LuthorCorp
Luthor Corp is a corporation run by Lex Luthor's father Lionel Luthor in Smallville. One of its bases is based in Smallville, LuthorCorp Fertilizer Plant No. 3 which has underground labs holding secret (and possibly illegal) research into genetically modifying living organisms using meteor rocks with the company's slogan being "We make things grow". Years later, Lex bought the company after he killed Lionel and inherited all of his money.

P

Project Atom
Project Atom is a U.S. government initiative masterminded by General Wade Eiling and lead scientist Dr. Heinrich Megala with the aim of creating a superhero answerable only to the military. The project used a combination of nuclear physics and a unique alloy called Dilustel with quantum properties that was cut from the skin of a captured alien known as the Silver Shield using X-Ionizer technology. The project had only two recorded successes, Captain Atom and Major Force. The origin of the woman calling herself the Bombshell is still unknown. Heinrich Megala was also responsible for creating the X-Ionizer technology capable of cutting Captain Atom's skin and the skin of most invulnerable metahumans.

Project Cadmus

Project Cadmus is a high tech genetic research facility responsible for the successful cloning of Jim Harper (the Guardian), and Conner Kent (the second Superboy), as well as a number of other heroes and villains.

Project 7734
Project 7734 is a secret U.S. military black-ops facility commanded by General Sam Lane. Its existence was uncovered by investigative reporter James Olsen's investigations. Like the Human Defense Corps, and Squad K, this project was created to defend humanity against extraterrestrial threats, including Kryptonians (the number of the project itself is a play on a "word" that can be created on most calculators by simply typing in the number 7734 - turned upside down, it reads as "Hell").

Project M

Project M was a secret government organization which operated during World War II and specialized in experimental biotechnology and necromancy. Known creations of the Project include the Creature Commandos, Miss America, and the G.I. Robot. The Project's main scientist is one Professor Mazursky. He was aided by Robotman. As told in Young All-Stars #12, they operated from a secret underground complex on mythical Ferris Island in New York.

Project Peacemaker

Project Peacemaker is a U.S. government division that was tasked with handling Peacemaker's interaction with other government agencies. After the so-called "Janus Directive", the Project became part of Checkmate, and placed under the supervision of the CBI and Sarge Steel.

Q

Quorum
The Quorum is the clandestine and apparently corrupt department of an unnamed government agency in the DC Comics Universe. Former operatives are Major Force, Mace Gardner (brother of Guy Gardner), Loria a New Blood, the metahuman known as Sledge, and an army of armored men known as Sweepers. The Quorum sponsored and funded the Blood Pack, a superhero team made up of "New Bloods", in a failed attempt to create a superhuman army based on their DNA.

R

Red Shadow
Red Shadow is the Russian version of Task Force X. Just as they copied Checkmate, they also mirrored the Suicide Squad under the old Soviet government (implying that they worked directly for the KGB). The organization originally consisted of ex-members of the People's Heroes and the Blue Trinity. Later on, other original Russian characters were introduced such as Stainoivolk, Russia's World War II version of Superman. The Red Shadow operatives were all organized under Amanda Waller's opposite number, a man known only as Major Zastrow. Other Red Shadow operatives were: Pozhar (converts matter into energy), Bolshoi (martial artist), Molotov (explosives expert), Mrs. Gradenko (a were-bear), Yerosha (could alter a person's senses), Lamia (pheromone manipulation), the Blue Trinity (speedsters), and Schreck (metahuman vampire).

RONOL

RONOL (short for Research on the Nature of Light) is a pre-World War II agency theorized that the light that originated millennia ago where Earth now orbits would eventually circumnavigate the universe and return as a dangerous, conscious entity. The project leader, Dr. Dayzl, tricked a reporter named Langford "Happy" Terrill into a ballooning accident where a "genetic light bomb" gave Terrill superpowers, abilities he would use to become the Ray. Eventually, Dayzl's unorthodox actions and beliefs came to light and the government terminated the RONOL program.

S

S.H.A.D.E.

S.H.A.D.E. (short for Super Human Advanced Defense Executive) is a fictional U.S. military organization that investigates, assesses, and contains paranormal and superhuman activity. Father Time and his S.H.A.D.E. agency exercise martial law over the devastated city of Blüdhaven. Father Time used this posting to carry out S.H.A.D.E.'s other mandate, the harvesting and creation of new metahuman talent. S.H.A.D.E. uses its specially trained metahuman talent to carry out black ops assassinations of threats to the United States and its policies. Several S.H.A.D.E. operatives defect from the organization to form a new version of the Freedom Fighters under the guidance of Uncle Sam, resulting in Sam and his team being declared enemies of S.H.A.D.E., and Father Time and his ally Gonzo the Mechanical Bastard ordering their deaths at the hands of First Strike (see Uncle Sam and the Freedom Fighters). After Father Time turned on the psychotic Gonzo, he and his troops vanished into the timestream; Uncle Sam and the Freedom Fighters were then made the leaders of S.H.A.D.E.

Spyral
Spyral (also known as "Second Hand") is a U.N sanctioned international agency, was founded by the German superspy Otto Netz, currently known under the pseudonym of "Doctor Dedalus". Thought Netz, Spyral specializes in mind erosion, brainwashing, and misdirection, with a heavy "spider's web" theme prevalent throughout and using Hypnos implant though Netz created this and Leviathan. His reasoning was that the two organizations to oppose each other in a never-ending cycle of vendetta, and grooming his children to manage the two agencies

In response to the escalating war between Batman Incorporated and the Leviathan terrorist organization, the UN decided to reform Spyral, recruited Doctor Dedalus' long-thought-dead daughter, Kathy Webb-Kane, as its leader. Using her personal resources, she recruited enough of a force to convince Batman, Inc. to disband as soon as the conflict was done<ref>Batman Incorporated #4</ref> Throughout the New 52, Dick Grayson later joined it with Helena Bertinelli. 

Squad K

Squad K is a special response team tasked with apprehending Superman if he should ever turn rogue, and with the apprehension of other Kryptonian criminals. Perseus Hazard, the grandson of Ulysses Hazard, was the group's first commander; after his death, he was replaced by a Native American named Sergeant Cloud, possibly a descendant of Johnny Cloud from the Losers.

S.T.O.R.M.
S.T.O.R.M. is the agency employing John Stone. It is a tribute to S.H.I.E.L.D. and a precursor to Stormwatch. It appears in the pages of Planetary''.

Stormwatch

Stormwatch is a United Nations crisis intervention team. It was founded by the United Nations during the late 1970s as part of an effort to police the growing population of post-humans created in the wake of the Comet Effect. The agency has generated significant controversy over the years. It was shut down in 1998 due to budgetary and political concerns. The agency was re-established sometime after the Authority's takeover of the United States under a severely limited budget.

Suicide Squad

The original Task Force X consisted of two branches: the domestic and the international. The domestic branch was called Argent and the international branch called the Suicide Squad was originally put under the command of General J.E.B. Stuart. The first Suicide Squad was a minor backup series about a quartet of adventurers. That version of the Squad consisted of Rick Flag, his girlfriend Karin Grace, Dr. Hugh Evans, and Jess Bright.

The second and better-known Suicide Squad was a "off the book" covert black ops government strike team. The team was partially made up of imprisoned supervillains and death row convicts with no hope of release. These criminals had either agreed to or were coerced into serving as expendable agents, assigned to perform extremely dangerous or impossible missions, in return for a full pardon for their actions. They were officially unsanctioned and publicly denied by the U.S. government. The prisoners' participation was used as rationale for plausible deniability in the event of failed missions, as the rationale claiming that the incidents are merely attacks by criminals.

In addition, there were other non-prisoner members (such as Nemesis, Nightshade, and the Oracle) who participated in the team as part of individual arrangements. The Suicide Squad operated out of Belle Reve Penitentiary in Louisiana.

T

Task Force Delta
Task Force Delta is a blanket organization that helps to oversee smaller U.S. government covert agencies such as Knightwatch.

Task Force X

The OSS was dissolved in October 1945 and replaced in 1946 by the CIA. In 1951, seeking to fill the void left by the retired Justice Society of America, President Harry S. Truman created Task Force X. The Task Force had a military and a civilian branch. The military branch called the Suicide Squad was put under the command by General J.E.B. Stuart, who was later succeeded by Rick Flag. The civilian branch called Argent was headed by a former OSS chief known only as Control. Many years later, it was revealed through a conflict with Waller's Suicide Squad that Control had died and his granddaughter was covertly leading the now-small underground organization.

T.H.U.N.D.E.R.

T.H.U.N.D.E.R. (short for The Higher United Nations Defense Enforcement Reserves) serves as a secretive counter-terrorism force. With a non-powered but highly trained special forces teams and a select number of agents fitted with powerful (but long-term dangerous to their health) performance-enhancing equipment, T.H.U.N.D.E.R. has fought against organizations like S.P.I.D.E.R. for decades, largely under the radar of the superhero community of the world.

U

Université Notre Dame des Ombres
Université Notre Dame des Ombres (Our Lady of the Shadows University) was originally created to train OSS agents during World War II. Today, it is a N.A.T.O.-sponsored covert intelligence training academy situated on the French Riviera, with an embassy office in Washington D.C. Its last known headmistress was Sandra Knight, the original Phantom Lady. The school's most notable graduates are the Crimson Fox twins and Dee Tyler, the second Phantom Lady.

W

World Army
In 2011, DC Comics rebooted the continuity of its books in an initiative called The New 52. On Earth 2, the World Army is a global military organization that was created to support the Wonders of the World. Its known members are Amar Khan, Commander Sonia Sato, Sam Lane, Robert Crane, and Stormy Foster. The World Army was organized after Earth 2's Superman, Wonder Woman, and Batman sacrificed their lives to fight off the invasion from Apokolips. They proceed to recruit and/or form alliances with superpowered individuals to prepare for the next attack from Apokolips.

See also
 List of government agencies in comics
 List of government agencies in Marvel Comics
 List of criminal organizations in DC Comics
 List of teams and organizations in DC Comics

References
  Text was copied from Spyral at DC Database, which is released under a Creative Commons Attribution-Share Alike 3.0 (Unported) (CC-BY-SA 3.0) license.

External links
 DCU Guide
 Databank Checkmate!
 Cosmic Teams
 Superman Homepage
 Titans Tower
 DC Comics: Heroes & Villains

List of government agencies in DC Comics
Government agencies in DC Comics, List of
Government agencies in DC Comics, List of
Comic DC